Simge Şebnem Aköz (born 23 April 1991) is a Turkish volleyball player for Eczacıbaşı VitrA and the Turkish national team.

She participated at the 2017 Women's European Volleyball Championship, and 2018 FIVB Volleyball Women's Nations League.

Awards

Club 
 2016 Club World Championship - Champion, with Eczacibasi Vitra
 2016-17 CEV champion League -  Bronze Medal, with Eczacibasi Vitra
 2017-18 CEV Cup -  Champion, with Eczacibasi Vitra
 2017-18 Turkish Cup -  Runner-Up, with Eczacibasi Vitra
 2017-18 Turkish League -  Runner-Up, with Eczacibasi
 2018 Spor Toto Champion's Cup (Turkish Super Cup) -  Champion, with Eczacibasi Vitra
 2018 Club world Championship -  Bronze Medal, with Eczacibasi Vitra
 2019 AXA  Insurance Cup Championship (Turkish Cup) -  Champion, with Eczacibasi Vitra
 2018-19 Turkish League -  Runner-Up, with Eczacibasi Vitra
 2019 Spor Toto Champion's Cup (Turkish Super Cup) -  Champion, with Eczacibasi Vitra
 2019 Club world Championship -  Runner-Up, with Eczacibasi Vitra
 2020 AXA Sigorta Champions Cup (Turkish Super Cup) -  Champion, with Eczacibasi Vitra
 2021-22 CEV Cup -  Champion, with Eczacibasi Dynavit

Individuals
 2019 European Championship "Best Libero"
 2019 FIVB Volleyball Women's Club World Championship "Best Libero"

National team
 2017 European Championship -  Bronze Medal
 2018 Nations League -   Silver Medal
 2019 European Championship -  Silver Medal
 2021 Nations League -   Bronze Medal
 2021 European Championship -  Bronze Medal

References

1991 births
Living people
Eczacıbaşı volleyball players
Turkish women's volleyball players
Volleyball players at the 2020 Summer Olympics
Olympic volleyball players of Turkey